Uruguay competed at the 1936 Summer Olympics in Berlin, Germany. 37 competitors, all men, took part in 15 events in 6 sports.

Basketball

Gregorio Agós
Humberto Bernasconi
Rodolfo Braselli
Prudencio de Pena
Carlos Gabín
Leandro Gómez Harley
Alejandro González Roig
Tabaré Quintans
Víctor Latou Jaume

Boxing

Antonio Adipe
Arquímedes Arrieta
Juan Bregaliano
Francisco Costanzo
José Feans
Alfredo Petrone
Fidel Tricánico

Fencing

Five fencers, all men, represented Uruguay in 1936.

Men's sabre
 París Rodríguez
 José Julián de la Fuente
 Carmelo Bentancur

Men's team sabre
 Carmelo Bentancur, José Julián de la Fuente, Hildemaro Lista, París Rodríguez, Jorge Rolando

Rowing

Uruguay had eight rowers participate in three out of seven rowing events in 1936.

 Men's single sculls
 Arquímedes Juanicó

 Men's coxless pair
 Baldomiro Benquet
 Gabriel Benquet

 Men's coxed four
 León Sánchez
 Juan Andrés Dutra
 Julio Flebbe
 Francisco Sunara
 Isidro Alonso (cox)

Sailing

Eugenio Lauz Santurio

Water polo

Alberto Batignani
José Castro
Julio Costemalle
Francisco Figueroa
Maximino García
Enrique Pereira
Hugo García

References

External links
Montevideo.com
Official Olympic Reports

Nations at the 1936 Summer Olympics
1936
1936 in Uruguayan sport